Fraternities and sororities have been a visible presence on the Trine University campus for 100 years. The campus hosts ten honor societies that recognize scholastic achievement, complimenting 13 active undergraduate social fraternities and sororities. Local societies had been predominant during the earlier, non-accredited era of campus growth, but beginning in 1947, national fraternities and then sororities colonized and now make up the majority of chapters. Tri-State's first men's social fraternity, Sigma Mu Sigma formed in 1921, and its first women's social sorority, Sigma Alpha Gamma (local) formed in 1926. 

As of 2018, 26% of male and 19% of female undergraduates are involved in these groups. Chapters are listed in order of date established, with active groups in bold and inactive groups in italics.

Fraternities 
Fraternities on campus include:
 (NIC) indicates members of the North American Interfraternity Conference.
 (FFC) indicates members of the Fraternity Forward Coalition.
 (PFA) indicates members of the Professional Fraternity Association.

Active Fraternities

  – Alpha Sigma Phi, 1935 (FFC, formerly NIC)
  – Tau Kappa Epsilon, 1947–1948, 1989 (NIC)
  – Sigma Phi Delta, 1947 engineering professional (formerly PFA)
  – Kappa Sigma, 1966 (formerly NIC)

  – Phi Kappa Theta, 1966 (NIC)
 Acacia, 1967–1979, 2012 (NIC)
  – Sigma Phi Epsilon, 1968 (formerly NIC)
  – Delta Chi, 1969 (NIC)

Fraternities whose name changed
 Square M Club (local), 1921-1921, became  (see ) 
 Four-Eleven Gang (local), 1922–1927, became  (see )  
  – Beta Phi Sigma (local), 1922–1932, became  
  – Phi Lambda Tau (local), 1925–1929, became  (see ) 
  – Lambda Phi Epsilon (local), 1927–1929, became  (see ) 
  – Gamma Eta Alpha (local), 1927–1931, became  
  – Phi Lambda Alpha, 1929–1931, became  
  – Beta Phi Theta, 1929–1969, became  
 Catholic Club (local), 1929–1940, became  (see ) 
  – Alpha Delta Alpha, 1930–1934, became  (see ) 

  – Alpha Kappa Pi, 1935–1946, became   
  – Alpha Lambda Tau, 1936–1947, became  
 Kadimah Society, 1936–1948, became  (see , then ) 
  – Alpha Gamma Omega (local), 1940–1965, became   
  – Theta Mu Phi, 1948–1950, became  (see )  
  – Tau Kappa Lambda (local), 1949–1952, became  
  – Alpha Gamma Upsilon, 1949–1968, became  
  – Beta Sigma Tau, 1950–1960, became   
  – Kappa Sigma Kappa, 1952–1962, reverted to  
  – Beta Sigma Chi, 1960–1966?, revived   
  – Tau Sigma (local), 1970–1981, became  (see Triangle)  
  – Nu Pi (local), 1981–1989, became Triangle

Dormant Fraternities
  – Phi Iota Alpha, 1931–1955 (NALFO and NIC), dormant 
  – Delta Kappa Phi, 1932-1936, dormant 
  – Sigma Delta Rho, 1934–1935 (NIC), dormant 
 Triangle, 1989–2008 (NIC), dormant

Sororities 
Sororities on campus include:

 (NPC) indicates members of the National Panhellenic Conference.
 (local) indicates a chapter unaffiliated with a national organization.

Active sororities

 ΚΣΑ – Kappa Sigma Alpha (local), 1991
 ΓΦΕ – Gamma Phi Epsilon (local), 1995

 ΑΣΤ – Alpha Sigma Tau, 2008 (NPC)
 ΘΦΑ – Theta Phi Alpha, 2012 (NPC)

Sororities whose names changed

  – Phi Sigma Sigma, 1992–1996 (NPC), became  
  – Zeta Theta Epsilon (local), 1998–2012, became  
  – Alpha Omega Epsilon (local), 1999–2002, 2004–2006, became

Dormant sororities
  – Sigma Alpha Gamma (local), 1926-193x, dormant 
  – Kappa Tau Sigma (local), 1954-19xx, dormant  

  – Omega Kappa (local), 1960?–19xx, dormant  
  – Sigma Kappa, 1977–1983 (NPC), dormant 
  – Zeta Eta Theta (local), 1982-19xx, dormant  
  – Phi Sigma (local), 1996-2023, dormant
  – Lambda Rho Mu (local), 19xx-19xx, dormant 
  – Alpha Theta Pi (local), 2005-20xx, dormant  
  – Kappa Beta Gamma, 2011–2016, dormant

Honor and professional fraternities 
Trine University hosts a number of honor societies. These include:

  – Chi Epsilon, 1973, honor, civil and environmental engineering
  – Pi Tau Sigma, 1972, honor, mechanical engineering
  – Tau Beta Pi, 1975, honor, engineering
  – Eta Kappa Nu, 1975, honor, electrical engineering
  – Delta Mu Delta, 1977, honor, business
  – Omega Chi Epsilon, 1980, honor, chemical engineering

  – Beta Beta Beta, 1980, honor, biological sciences
  – Pi Sigma Alpha, 1981, honor, political sciences
  – Phi Eta Sigma, 1983, honor, first-year academic achievement
  – Sigma Tau Delta, honor, English
 Order of Omega, 2008, honor, Greek Life leadership
  – Lambda Alpha Epsilon, honor, criminal justice

The school also features a Christian Campus House ministry.

Notes

References

Trine University
Trine University